Can U Cook? is the ninth studio album by American bluesman Seasick Steve.

It was released on the 28 September 2018, and peaked at 27 on the UK Albums Chart.

Background
Seasick Steve announced his ninth album after playing at a gig at Hyde Park on the 6 July 2018.

The album was recorded predominantly in a converted ice house in Key West.

"The Last Rodeo" was released as a first single from the album.

Track listing

Credits
Artwork [Album Artwork], Layout – Tony Berg (2), Åmåls Grafiska AB
Backing Vocals [Background Vocal] – Brother Jan Paternoster* (tracks: 7)
Beats [Beat] – Brother Ed Sheeran* (tracks: 8), Brother Joe Rubel*
Crew [Shrimp Boat Crew] – Chef Rick, J.L. Jamison, Rick Humes, Ross Alexander (4)
Directed By [Direction] – Luther Dickinson (tracks: 11)
Drums, Percussion – Dan Magnusson
Engineer – Boo Mitchell (tracks: 11)
Harmonica – Brother Mickey Raphael* (tracks: 3, 7)
Harmonica [Harp] – Brother Cory Younts* (tracks: 4)
Lead Guitar, Bass, Washtub Bass [Washboard Bass], Guitar [Cigar Box Stuff] – Luther Dickinson
Mastered By – Pete Lyman
Mixed By [Assisted By] – Mike Fahey (2)
Organ – Brother Rev Charles Hodges* (tracks: 11)
Performer [Assorted String Things And Hollerin'] – Seasick Steve
Photography By [Cover Photo], Photography By [Liner Photos] – Dan Magnusson
Piano – Brother Cory Younts* (tracks: 7)
Producer [Produced By] – Seasick Steve
Recorded By – Joe Rubel (tracks: 3)
Recorded By [Additional Recording By] – Vance Powell (tracks: 3)
Recorded By [Assistant] – Dan Ewins (tracks: 3), Nat Graham* (tracks: 3)
Recorded By, Mixed By – Vance Powell
Songwriter [All Songs Written By] – Steve Wold
Synthesizer [Moog Bass] – Brother Adam Double* (tracks: 3)

References

2018 albums
Seasick Steve albums